Williamson Senior High School is a small, rural, public, combined junior senior high school located at 33 Jct Cross Road, Tioga, Tioga County, Pennsylvania, US. It is one of two high schools operated by the Northern Tioga School District. Williamson Senior High School serves the eastern portion of the district. In 2015, enrollment was 521 pupils in 7th through 12th grades.

The BLaST Intermediate Unit IU17 provides the school with a wide variety of services like specialized education for disabled students and hearing, background checks for employees, state mandated recognizing and reporting child abuse training, speech and visual disability services and criminal background check processing for prospective employees and professional development for staff and faculty. Williamson Senior High School does not have an association with a public Career and Technical Center.

Extracurriculars
Northern Tioga School District offers a wide variety of clubs, activities and an extensive, publicly funded sports program at Williamson Senior High School.

Sports
The district funds the following sports at Williamson:
Varsity

Boys
Baseball - A
Basketball- A
Soccer - A
Track and field - AA
Wrestling - AA

Girls
Basketball - AA
Cheerleading - AAAA
Soccer - A
Softball - A
Track and field - AA
Volleyball - A

Junior high school sports

Boys
Basketball
Soccer
Track and field
Wrestling 

Girls
Basketball
Soccer
Track and field
Volleyball

According to PIAA directory July 2015

References

Public high schools in Pennsylvania
Schools in Tioga County, Pennsylvania